Madonna of the Sleeping Cars (French: La madone des sleepings) is a 1955 French drama film directed by Henri Diamant-Berger and starring Giselle Pascal, Jean Gaven and Erich von Stroheim. The film is an adaptation of the 1925 novel of the same title by Maurice Dekobra, though the plot has been changed somewhat, and the action brought into the 1950s and set in Latin America rather than the Black Sea coast of the USSR.

It was shot at the Victorine Studios in Nice, with sets designed by the art director Eugène Piérac. Location shooting took place in Paris and elsewhere.

Cast
 Giselle Pascal as Lady Diana Wynham  
 Jean Gaven as Don Armando Félix  
 Erich von Stroheim as Dr. Siegfried Traurig (final film)
 Philippe Mareuil as Gérard Dextrier  
 Denise Vernac as Anna  
 Berthe Cardona
 Fernand Rauzéna as Le Queledec  
 Jacqueline Dane as Clara  
 Joé Davray as L'ingénieur  
 Jackie Blanchot 
 Jacques Jouanneau as Henri - le chauffeur  
 Robert Burnier as Commodore Felton  
 Katherine Kath as Irena 
 Lucien Callamand as L'actionnaire  
 Paul Demange as Le voyageur 
 Raymond Ménage 
 Betty Phillippsen 
 René Worms as Arthur

See also
 Change of Heart (1928), with Juliette Compton as Lady Winham
 Madonna of the Sleeping Cars (1928), with Claude France as Lady Diana Wynham
 The Phantom Gondola (1936), with Marcelle Chantal as Lady Diana Wyndham

References

Bibliography 
 Goble, Alan. The Complete Index to Literary Sources in Film. Walter de Gruyter, 1999.

External links 
 

1955 films
French drama films
1955 drama films
1950s French-language films
Films directed by Henri Diamant-Berger
Films based on French novels
Remakes of French films
Films shot at Victorine Studios
French black-and-white films
1950s French films